The Secret Life of Marilyn Monroe is a 2015 American drama miniseries on Marilyn Monroe. It stars Kelli Garner, Susan Sarandon, Emily Watson, Jeffrey Dean Morgan, and Eva Amurri Martino and was first aired on Lifetime on May 30 and 31, 2015.  The (two-hour forty-seven minute) miniseries is based on The New York Times bestseller of the same name by J. Randy Taraborrelli. It was nominated for three Creative Arts Emmy Awards

Plot
A chronicle of Marilyn Monroe's family life, her relationship with her mother, Gladys Pearl Baker, and how she succeeded in hiding her most intimate secrets from the press and an invasive world.

Cast

Main characters
Kelli Garner as Marilyn Monroe
Susan Sarandon as Gladys Pearl Baker, Marilyn's mother
Emily Watson as Grace McKee, Marilyn's foster mother, later called "aunt" 
Jack Noseworthy as Alan DeShields, Marilyn's therapist  
Giacomo Gianniotti as Jimmy Dougherty, Marilyn's first husband
Jeffrey Dean Morgan as Joe DiMaggio, Marilyn's second husband
Stephen Bogaert as Arthur Miller, Marilyn's third husband
Matthew Bennett as Whitey, Marilyn's makeup artist
Embeth Davidtz as Natasha Lytess, Marilyn's acting coach
Peter MacNeill as Mr. Schenck, Chairman of Fox Studios  
Tony Nardi as Johnny Hyde, Marilyn's agent
Barry Flatman as Mr. Zanuck, Studio Head of 20th Century Fox
Angela Vint as Patricia Newcomb, Marilyn's publicist
Tamara Hickey as Patricia Kennedy Lawford

Supporting characters
Eva Amurri Martino as young Gladys Pearl Baker
Gloria Gruber as Ida Bolender, Marilyn's caretaker as a child, also called "aunt" 
Vickie Papavs as Mrs. Murray, Marilyn's housekeeper
Morgan Kelly as Tom Kelly, photographer  
Michael Rash as Billy Wilder, Marilyn's director 
Norm Owen as Richard Sherman
Neil Crone as Don Lyon
Jeff Kassel as Dr. Ennis, Gladys' doctor
Sarah Booth as Mrs. Kelly
Carolina Bartczak as Phyllis
Lindsay G Merrithew as the Beverly Hill Physician
Ella Allan as young Marilyn Monroe (Norma Jeane)
Mia Allan as young Marilyn Monroe (Norma Jeane)

Reception

Critical reception 
The Secret Life of Marilyn Monroe garnered mixed reviews. Keith Ulrich of The Hollywood Reporter writes, "There's little that's surprising or inspired in Lifetime's two-part miniseries about iconic Hollywood celebrity Marilyn Monroe." While, Brian Lowry of Variety writes, "What sets this latest rehash of the star's existence apart, marginally, is a knockout performance by Kelli Garner and, to a lesser degree, Susan Sarandon's turn as her mentally disturbed mother." A positive review by Jordan Appugliesi of US Weekly states, "Surprise! It's Actually Good." On Rotten Tomatoes the series has an approval of 55% based on 11 reviews with an average rating of 6/10. The site's critical consensus reads, "Offering few revelations, The Secret Life of Marilyn Monroe treads the same well-worn path as many other Monroe biopics, despite an admirable performance by Kelli Garner". On Metacritic, the series has a score of 55 out of 100 based on 12 critics, indicating "mixed or average".

Accolades

References

External links

2010s American television miniseries
Works about Marilyn Monroe
Lifetime (TV network) films
Cultural depictions of Joe DiMaggio